Shmuel Dayan (8 August 1891 – 11 August 1968) was a Zionist activist during the British Mandate of Palestine and an Israeli politician who served in the first three Knessets.

Biography
Born in the town of Zhashkiv in the Russian Empire (today in Ukraine), he joined the Zionist movement as a boy and emigrated to Palestine, then under Ottoman rule, in 1908. He  worked in agriculture in Petah Tikva, Rehovot, Yavne'el and Kinneret until 1911, when he became active in Hapoel Hatzair (the Young Workers Party). He was also one of the earliest settlers in Degania, the country's first kibbutz, though he left in 1921 to help establish the moshav Nahalal. According to his grandson, he, as opposed to his wife Devorah, never personally worked more than 2 weeks at the kibbutz, but spent most of his life in hotels.  As one of the leaders of the nascent Moshav Movement, he made several trips to the United States and Poland as a Zionist emissary.

In 1949, he was elected to the First Knesset for the Mapai party, and served as Deputy Speaker of the Knesset. In 1951, he used his official Service Passport to travel abroad, mainly to the US, on official meetings. He continued as a member of the next two Knessets, until 1959.

Shmuel Dayan was the father of Israeli general and politician Moshe Dayan and the grandfather of politician Yael Dayan and director Assi Dayan.

References

External links
 

1891 births
1968 deaths
Shmuel
Deputy Speakers of the Knesset
Israeli Jews
Israeli people of Ukrainian-Jewish descent
Jewish Israeli politicians
Jews in Mandatory Palestine
Jews in Ottoman Palestine
Emigrants from the Russian Empire to the Ottoman Empire
Mapai politicians
Members of the Assembly of Representatives (Mandatory Palestine)
Members of the 1st Knesset (1949–1951)
Members of the 2nd Knesset (1951–1955)
Members of the 3rd Knesset (1955–1959)
Ukrainian Jews